Marin Lovrović (born June 16, 1973, in Rijeka) is a Croatian Olympic sailor in the Star class. He competed in the 2008 Summer Olympics together with Siniša Mikuličić, where he finished 15th and in the 2012 Summer Olympics, where he finished 16th together with his brother Dan.

Marin Lovrović has also competed together with his father Marin Lovrović Sr.

References

Croatian male sailors (sport)
Olympic sailors of Croatia
1973 births
Living people
Sailors at the 2008 Summer Olympics – Star
Sailors at the 2012 Summer Olympics – Star
Sportspeople from Rijeka